Eremophila gibbosa, commonly known as humped fuchsia bush, is a flowering plant in the figwort family, Scrophulariaceae and is endemic to Western Australia. It is a shrub with broad, shiny, sticky leaves and yellowish-green flowers and which often forms dense thickets.

Description
It has the ability to sucker, sometimes forming dense thickets.

The tube is yellowish-green and covered with glandular hairs on both the inside and outside. The 4 stamens extend beyond the end of the tube.

Taxonomy and naming
Eremophila gibbosa was first formally described by Robert Chinnock in 1979 and the description was published in Journal of the Adelaide Botanic Garden. The specific epithet (gibbosa) is a Latin word meaning "humpbacked", "humped", "crooked" or "bent" referring to the shape of the fruits of this species.

Distribution and habitat
This eremophila often grows on clay loam in disturbed areas such as those affected by fire. It occurs between Balladonia and Lake Johnston in the Coolgardie biogeographic region.

Conservation status
Humped fuchsia bush is classified as "not threatened" by the Western Australian Government Department of Parks and Wildlife.

Use in horticulture
The unusual foliage of this eremophila is an attractive feature as are the small blue to purple flowers. It is suitable for a small garden or as a container plant. It can be propagated from cuttings but may perform better if grafted onto Myoporum rootstock. The grafted form will grow in most soils. The shrub is tolerant of drought and frost but benefits from an occasional watering during dry periods.

References

gibbosa
Eudicots of Western Australia
Plants described in 1979
Endemic flora of Western Australia
Taxa named by Robert Chinnock